Mantus is a German band from Cologne, formed in 1997 by Martin Schindler. The band's name derives from the eponymous god of the underworld of the Etruscans. The band was disbanded in 2005 but reunited in 2008.

Members

Current members 
 Martin Schindler — music, lyrics, vocals (1997–present)
 Chiara Amberia — vocals (since 2012)

Former members 
 Tina Schindler — vocals (until 2012)

Discography

Albums 
 Liebe und Tod (2000)
 Abschied (2001)
 Fremde Welten (2002)
 Weg ins Paradies (2003)
 Ein Hauch von Wirklichkeit (2004)
 Zeit muss enden (2005)
 Chronik (Best of) (2006)
 Requiem (2009)
 Demut (2010)
 Die Hochzeit von Himmel und Hölle (2010)
 Zeichen (2011)
 Wölfe (2012)
 Fatum (Best Of) (2013)
 Portrait aus Wut und Trauer (2014)
 Melancholia (2015)
 Refugium (2016)
 Staub & Asche (2018)
 Katharsis (2019)
 Manifest (2021)

EPs 
 Keine Liebe (2004)
 Königreich der Angst (2009)
 Sünder (2011)

External links 
 Official website 

German musical groups
Musical groups established in 1997